Bou (English : Mother) is a 1998 Indian Odia-language drama film. It was directed, produced and written by Sabyasachi Mohapatra. Usasi Misra, Jyoti Misra and Akshaya Bastia debuted in the film.

Synopsis
Umakant (Bijay Mohanty) and Durga (Mahasweta Roy) lives happily with two sons Deepak (Siddhanta Mahapatra) and Amar (Akshaya Bastia) and daughter-in-law Seema (Usasi Misra), the wife of Deepak. Umakant does everything for his children's better up-keeping. One day Umakant meets an accident and becomes handicap. Instead of supporting the parents, Deepak and Amar desert them and live separately. In the meantime Durga comes to rescue of Umakant and tries to find a job for herself to support her family. Durga has dress designing skills. With supports from Atal Bihari (Mihir Das), she finds a job of dress designer in a company. By her outstanding skills, she excelled in her profession and good fortune. The time passes away, Deepak and Amar face lot of trouble in their life and become bankrupt. They seek help from their parents, Durga refuse to help them any way. But Umakant convinces durga to support and forgive their children and at last the family united.

Cast
 Bijay Mohanty as 	Umakant Rautrai
 Mahasweta Roy as 	Durga Rautrai
 Mihir Das as Atal Bihari
 Siddhanta Mahapatra as Deepak Rautrai
 Usasi Misra as Seema Rautrai
 Jyoti Misra as Manisha
 Sarat Pujari as Industrialist
 Jairam Samal as Trinath Tandi
 Snigdha Mohanty as Atal's wife
 Akshaya Bastia as Amar Rautrai
 George Tiadi as Anadi
 Indu Patra		
 Dhira Basa

Awards

References

External links
 

1998 films
1990s Odia-language films
Films directed by Sabyasachi Mohapatra
1998 drama films
Indian drama films